Valentina Sergeyevna Stenina (born 29 December 1934) is a former speed skater who competed for the Soviet Union.

Born Valentina Miloslavova in Babruysk (which is now part of Belarus), she fled to Sverdlovsk – taken by her mother – in 1941 because of World War II. In Sverdlovsk, she took up speed skating, training at VSS Trud,  and met and married fellow skater Boris Stenin.

In 1959, Stenina participated in her first World Allround Championships, held in her home town of Sverdlovsk, and she won silver. The next year, 1960, was a very good year for Stenina: her husband Boris became Soviet Allround Champion, then Boris won silver at the European Allround Championships, then she herself became World Allround Champion, then Boris became World Allround Champion, and then at the 1960 Winter Olympics of Squaw Valley, she won silver on the 3,000 m behind Lidia Skoblikova, while Boris won bronze on the 1,500 m. In addition, Boris received the Oscar Mathisen Award that year. Valentina was not even considered for that award since women were not eligible to win it until 1987.

The following year (1961), Stenina successfully defended her World Champion title in a grand way with victories in three distances and a second place in the fourth. Later that month, she won the Soviet National Championships – a title she would win a total number of four times in her career (in 1961, 1965, 1966, and 1967). Stenina did not compete in 1962 but returned in 1963, winning bronze at the World Championships. At the 1964 Winter Olympics of Innsbruck, she won another silver medal on the 3,000 m, again behind Skoblikova. Another silver medal at the World Championships would follow in 1965 and she became World Champion for the third and final time in 1966, this time not winning any of the four distances.

For her accomplishments, Stenina was awarded the title of Honorable Citizen of Sverdlovsk in 1967 – the year she won her third consecutive (and fourth total) Soviet National Championships title. In 1968, she ended her career as a speed skater. Stenina currently lives in Yekaterinburg (which is the name that Sverdlovsk was changed back to in 1991). Her husband Boris died in 2001.

Medals
An overview of medals won by Stenina at important championships she participated in, listing the years in which she won each:

Personal records
To put these personal records in perspective, the WR column lists the official world records on the dates that Stenina skated her personal records.

External links
 
 Valentina Stenina at SkateResults.com
 Valentina Stenina. Deutsche Eisschnelllauf Gemeinschaft e.V. (German Skating Association).
 Results of Championships of Russia and the USSR from SpeedSkating.ru
 Historical World Records. International Skating Union.

1934 births
Living people
People from Babruysk
Soviet female speed skaters
Olympic speed skaters of the Soviet Union
Olympic silver medalists for the Soviet Union
Speed skaters at the 1960 Winter Olympics
Speed skaters at the 1964 Winter Olympics
Olympic medalists in speed skating
Russian people of Belarusian descent
Russian female speed skaters
Medalists at the 1960 Winter Olympics
Medalists at the 1964 Winter Olympics
World Allround Speed Skating Championships medalists